British moth is the name of an  sailing dinghy designed in 1932 by Sydney Cheverton.

The first boats built were sailed on the Brent Reservoir in north London.  British Moths were the first class to use this famous stretch of water for dinghy racing, and for a time it was known as the "Brent One Design". The British Moth National Championship trophy is still the Brent Cup.

After World War II, sailing was not resumed on the Brent Reservoir and the fleet became scattered.  However, the British Moth continued to sail at other clubs in small numbers.

In 2004 the British Moth Boat Association funded the development of a new hull mould designed by Ian Howlett. This has seen renewed activity within club fleets and a number of river clubs taking up the class.

See also
 Common origins with the International Moth (dinghy)

References

External links
 British Moth Boat Association website
 One of the largest British Moth fleets can be found at Medley Sailing Club, Oxford

Dinghies